Praça Martim Moniz is a square in Lisbon, Portugal named after Martim Moniz.

There are stops on the Lisbon Metro "Martim Moniz" and Lisbon tramway at the square.

See also
Procession of Our Lord of the Passion of Graça

References

Squares in Lisbon